Hope Bagot is a hamlet and civil parish in Shropshire, England.

It is situated south of Cleehill and the parish is hilly in nature.
 
The parish church in the hamlet is St John the Baptist's Church, which is small and largely Norman in style. It is a grade I listed building.

See also
Listed buildings in Hope Bagot

References

Civil parishes in Shropshire
Villages in Shropshire